Beastmaster 2: Through the Portal of Time is the 1991 sequel to the 1982 film The Beastmaster. Marc Singer reprises his role as Dar, a barbarian from another dimension who travels to 1990s Los Angeles and befriends a young woman, Jackie Trent, played by Kari Wuhrer. Dar must stop his evil brother, played by Wings Hauser, from bringing back a neutron bomb.

Plot
Dar, the Beastmaster, learns of a previously unknown half-brother, Arklon, who plans to conquer the land with the help of a sorceress named Lyranna. Both escape to present day Los Angeles through a dimensional portal. Dar and his animal companions, Ruh, Kodo, Podo and Sharak, must follow them through the portal and stop them from obtaining a neutron bomb. During his visit, Dar meets a rich girl named Jackie Trent, and they become friends.

Cast
 Marc Singer as Dar 
 Kari Wuhrer as Jackie Trent 
 Sarah Douglas as Lyranna 
 Wings Hauser as Arklon 
 James Avery as Lieutenant Coberly 
 Robert Fieldsteel as Bendowski 
 Arthur Malet as Wendel 
 Robert Z'Dar as Zavic

Production
Jim Wynorski was originally meant to direct and wrote a screenplay with R. J. Robertson for producer Sylvio Tabet. Wynorski later said:
We wrote him a helluva good screenplay. Then at the last moment, he pulls the rug out from under me and says he's directing it himself. And then tops it off by threatening to take our writing credits off the picture. I took the bastard straight to court. He hired big time attorneys to stall paying out the final script installments. I hated his guts. But I got the last laugh when Republic Pictures picked up the show. They wanted a picture totally clean of legal entanglements. So they came to me to make a deal and I held them up but good. Cleaned up. I still remember Tabet's pained face when I told him what it would take to get me to sign off. Even my own lawyer whined!
Shooting locations include Glen Canyon and Antelope Canyon. Parts of the film were also shot in Los Angeles and Canoga Park, California as well as the Grand Canyon in Arizona. Director and co-writer Sylvio Tabet was a producer on the original film. Andre Norton's novel The Beast Master was credited as an inspiration. After reading the first film's screenplay, Norton had her credit removed, but her agent talked her into allowing it for the sequel.

Release
Beastmaster 2 was given a limited release in the United States, where it grossed between $773,490 and $869,325.

Reception
Rotten Tomatoes, a review aggregator, reports that 17% of six surveyed critics gave the film a positive review; the average rating is 3/10. Kevin Thomas of the Los Angeles Times called it "a silly, ill-advised sequel" that is not funny despite Singer's "likable presence". Roger Hurlburt of the Sun-Sentinel wrote that the film is tongue-in-cheek enough to make audiences forgive its frivolity. Hurlburt also complimented Douglas' acting. Chris Hicks of the Deseret News wrote that the film is not clever or funny enough to overcome its silliness. TV Guide, in rating it 2/4 stars, wrote: "The satire in Beastmaster 2 hardly breaks new ground, but it's a tonic that makes the minutes pass more or less agreeably". Like Beastmaster, it was broadcast regularly on American cable television stations TBS and TNT.

References

External links
 
 

1991 films
1990s action adventure films
1990s fantasy adventure films
1990s science fiction action films
1991 directorial debut films
1990s adventure films
1991 fantasy films
1991 independent films
American fantasy adventure films
American science fiction action films
American independent films
American sequel films
1990s English-language films
Films about time travel
Films based on American novels
Films based on fantasy novels
Films shot in Utah
Films set in Los Angeles
Films shot in Los Angeles
Films shot in California
Beastmaster films
Films shot in Arizona
Republic Pictures films
American sword and sorcery films
Films scored by Robert Folk
1990s American films